Romulo Bruni (18 May 1871 – 14 May 1939) was an Italian cyclist. He competed in the men's sprint event at the 1900 Summer Olympics.

References

External links
 

1871 births
1939 deaths
Italian male cyclists
Olympic cyclists of Italy
Cyclists at the 1900 Summer Olympics
Cyclists from Milan